The Hirth 3202 and 3203 are a family of in-line twin cylinder, two stroke, carburetted aircraft engines, with optional fuel injection, designed for use on ultralight aircraft, especially two seat ultralight trainers, gyrocopters and small homebuilts. It is manufactured by Hirth of Germany.

Development
The 3203 was developed as a replacement for the Hirth 2706 and as a competitor to the  Rotax 582. It replaced the 2706 in the Hirth line in May 2002. The engine is similar to the Rotax powerplant in being a two-cylinder in-line engine, with dual capacitor discharge ignition, although it is air-cooled, compared to the 582's liquid cooling. The 3202 was developed from the 3203 as a de-rated version to replace the Hirth 2704 and compete with the  Rotax 503. Both engines have the same bore, stroke, displacement, compression ratio, and weight as the Hirth engines they replace.

Both the 3202 and 3203 use free air or fan cooling, with dual Bing 34 mm slide carburetors or optionally fuel injection. The cylinder walls are electrochemically coated with Nikasil. Standard starting is recoil start with electric start as an option. The reduction drive system available is the G-50 gearbox, with reduction ratios of 2.16:1, 2.29:1, 2.59:1, 3.16:1, or 3.65:1, with a cog-belt reduction drive optional.

The engines run on a 50:1 pre-mix of unleaded 93 octane auto fuel and oil, or optionally oil injection.

Variants
3202
Twin-cylinder in-line, two stroke, aircraft engine with a dual Bing 34mm slide carburetors or fuel injection. Produces  at 5500 rpm and has a factory rated TBO of 1200 hours. In production. Replaced the 2704 in production in May 2002.
3203
Twin-cylinder in-line, two stroke, aircraft engine with dual Bing 34mm slide carburetors or fuel injection. Produces  at 6300 rpm and has a factory rated TBO of 1000 hours. In production. Replaced the 2706 in production in May 2002.

Applications
3202

3203

Specifications (3203)

See also

References

External links
Official 3202 page
Official 3203 page

Hirth aircraft engines
Air-cooled aircraft piston engines
Two-stroke aircraft piston engines